Tito Tolin (born 28 October 1935) is an Italian ski jumper. He competed in the individual event at the 1956 Winter Olympics.

References

1935 births
Living people
Italian male ski jumpers
Olympic ski jumpers of Italy
Ski jumpers at the 1956 Winter Olympics
Place of birth missing (living people)